Portucalense Infante D. Henrique University (UPT) is a Portuguese private university established as a cooperative on the basis of the Decree No 122/86 of 28 June 1986.

Location and facilities
UPT is located in Porto at Rua Dr. António Bernardino de Almeida, 541, and at the Asprela University campus near the S. João Hospital and the IPO of Porto. Various means of transport are available at the entrance to the university, namely lines 6, 54, 59 and 79 of STCP buses and Porto's Metro Line D (Yellow).

Facilities include computer labs with Wi-Fi access available 24 hours a day, library, bars, cafeteria, indoor and outdoor terraces and parking lots.

Departments 
UPT has five departments offering study programmes:
 Department of Law
 Department of Psychology and Education
 Department of Economics and Management
 Department of Science and Technology
 Department of Tourism, Heritage and Culture

Research 
UPT is also a research institutions in Portugal. The research activities are organized within research unites.

Portucalense Institute for Legal Research (IJP) 

Portucalense Institute for Legal Research was created in 2007, thus complying with the new legal requirements established by the Portuguese Legal Regime of Higher Education Institutions. It is a result of the restructuring and redesign of the Legal Institute existing since 1987, who developed all extra-curricular activities of the Department of Law, from the Preparotory Course for Admission to the Centre for Legal Studies (CEJ), through the publication of Portucalense Law Review (Law Journal), to the various postgraduate and specialization courses, conferences and debates. The Portucalense Institute for Legal Research presents itself now, with a new structure intending to give visibility to the research produced in the Department of Law of the University Portucalense, promoting their dissemination and establishing partnerships with research units in Portugal and overseas.

Institute of Human Development Portucalense 

The Institute of Human Development Portucalense was created with the purpose of promoting the scientific investigation of the human being. The Institute aims to give visibility to the research produced at the Portucalense University, promoting its dissemination and establishing partnerships with national and foreign counterparts.

REMIT - Research on Economics, Management and Information Technologies 

The REMIT is a multidisciplinary and interdisciplinary research unit that has a holistic approach with several competing scientific fields: Economics, Management, Finance, Tourism, Heritage, Patrimony; History; Engineering, Technology and Information Systems, Mathematics and Statistics. REMIT aims to produce theoretical and applied knowledge that enables a better understanding of the interdisciplinary dynamics and trends of the contemporary world and its socioeconomic effects, contributing to the design, implementation and evaluation of organizational strategies and public policies.

Links & references

External links
Official website

Private universities and colleges in Portugal
Educational institutions established in 1986
Schools in Porto
1986 establishments in Portugal